Franz Schädler (8 October 1917 – 10 December 1941) was a Liechtensteiner alpine skier who competed in the 1936 Winter Olympics.

He was born at Triesenberg, Liechtenstein, and died at Makiivka, Donetsk Oblast in Ukraine in December 1941 aged 24.

References

External links
 

1917 births
1941 deaths
Liechtenstein male alpine skiers
Olympic alpine skiers of Liechtenstein
Alpine skiers at the 1936 Winter Olympics
German military personnel killed in World War II